The European Communities (Amendment) Act 1998 (c. 21) is an Act of the Parliament of the United Kingdom which saw the third major amendment to the European Communities Act 1972 to include the provisions that was agreed in the Amsterdam Treaty which was signed on 2 October 1997 to be incorporated into the domestic law of the United Kingdom  It was given Royal assent on 11 June 1998.

The Act was repealed by the European Union (Withdrawal) Act 2018 on 31 January 2020.

See also
 Acts of Parliament of the United Kingdom relating to the European Communities and the European Union
 European Economic Area
 European Union 

Acts of the Parliament of the United Kingdom relating to the European Union
United Kingdom Acts of Parliament 1998